Hasanabad-e Chenar Sukhteh (also Romanized as Ḩasanābād-e Chenār Sūkhteh; also known as Ḩasanābād) is a village in Ruin Rural District, in the Central District of Esfarayen County, North Khorasan Province, Iran. At the 2006 census, its population was 193, in 49 families.

References 

Populated places in Esfarayen County